Sonia Asselah (born 20 August 1991 in Tizi Ouzou) is an Algerian judoka. She competed at the 2012 Summer Olympics, but eliminated in the first round by Karina Bryant. She qualified for the 2016 Summer Olympics and was the Algerian flag bearer.

At the 2021 African Judo Championships held in Dakar, Senegal, she won the silver medal in her event.  She had previously won the silver medal in the event in 2020.

She competed at the 2020 Summer Olympics where she finished in 17th place after losing to Yelyzaveta Kalanina of Ukraine in the first round.

References

External links

 
 
 

1991 births
Living people
Algerian female judoka
Judoka at the 2012 Summer Olympics
Judoka at the 2016 Summer Olympics
Olympic judoka of Algeria
Sportspeople from Tizi Ouzou
African Games silver medalists for Algeria
African Games medalists in judo
Competitors at the 2018 Mediterranean Games
Mediterranean Games bronze medalists for Algeria
Mediterranean Games medalists in judo
Competitors at the 2011 All-Africa Games
Competitors at the 2019 African Games
Judoka at the 2020 Summer Olympics
21st-century Algerian women
20th-century Algerian women